Ghulam Hassan is a male Muslim given name. It may refer to

Ghulam Hassan Safi (1902–1984), Afghan politician and diplomat
Ghulam Hassan Shaggan (born 1928), Pakistani classical singer of the Gwalior Gharana
Ghulam Hassan Sofi (1932–2009), singer and harmonium player of traditional music of Kashmir
Ghulam Hassan Khan (born 1936), Indian politician, Jammu and Kashmir
Ghulam Hassan Pinglana (1939–1998), Indian politician, Jammu and Kashmir
Ghulam Hassan Lobsang, promoter of Balti language and Balti culture